Clifford Hurst Keal (2 March 1901 – 3 October 1965) was an Australian rules footballer for the Port Adelaide Football Club between 1920 and 1929.

Football
He served as captain from 1924 to 1925, won the clubs best and fairest in 1927 and was a premiership player for the club in 1921 and 1928. Clifford Keal began a  tradition when he captained the club by wearing the number 1 on his guernsey.

See also
 1927 Melbourne Carnival

References

1901 births
1965 deaths
Port Adelaide Football Club (SANFL) players
Port Adelaide Football Club players (all competitions)
Australian rules footballers from Adelaide